Fausto Gresini (23 January 1961 – 23 February 2021) was an Italian Grand Prix motorcycle racer, who was World Champion in 1985 and 1987. He was in his later years team manager for the Aprilia Racing Team Gresini MotoGP team.

Motorcycle racing career
Gresini was born at Imola. He began racing in 1978 at the age of 17 on a Minarelli 50 in Italy, and in 1983 he joined the Grand Prix circuit with the MBA team.

During his riding career, Gresini won two world championship titles in the 125cc class in 1985 and 1987. He was vice-champion in the 125cc class in 1986 aboard a Garelli and in 1991 and 1992 with Honda. He accumulated 21 victories and raced in 132 Grand Prix with 15 second places and 11 third places. He is tied with Ángel Nieto for the record of 11 consecutive victories in the 125 class, accomplished across 1986 and 1987. He holds the record of the most 125cc victories in one season with ten in 1987 - he crashed in the final race but won all others.

Racing team management career
Gresini held the management role for the Aprilia Racing Team Gresini MotoGP team. His team has won two world championships with Daijiro Kato winning the 2001 250cc world championship, and Toni Elías winning the 2010 Moto2 world championship. Kato died in hospital two weeks after crashing during the 2003 Japanese Grand Prix on 6 April 2003. On 23 October 2011, the Gresini team suffered another loss when rider Marco Simoncelli died soon after an accident at the Malaysian Grand Prix. The team's other rider at the time was Hiroshi Aoyama.

Death 
On 27 December 2020, Gresini was hospitalized at the Ospedale Maggiore in Bologna after contracting COVID-19 amid the COVID-19 pandemic in Italy. After an apparent initial improvement in his condition, on 18 February 2021 he worsened with a serious lung infection. He died in hospital from the illness' complications on 23 February 2021, at the age of 60, one month after his birthday.

Grand Prix career statistics 
Points system from 1969 to 1987.

Points system from 1988 to 1992

Points system from 1993 onwards.

(key) (Races in bold indicate pole position; races in italics indicate fastest lap)

See also
Gresini Racing

References

External links
 Bio at Gresini Racing

1961 births
2021 deaths
Italian motorcycle racers
Motorcycle racing team owners
People from Imola
125cc World Championship riders
Deaths from the COVID-19 pandemic in Emilia-Romagna
Sportspeople from the Metropolitan City of Bologna
125cc World Riders' Champions